The Penn Quakers men's ice hockey team represents the University of Pennsylvania in the American Collegiate Hockey Association Division II. Penn is a member of the Colonial States College Hockey Conference. The Quakers play at the Class of 1923 Arena in Philadelphia, Pennsylvania.

History 
Penn's first ice hockey team formed for the 1896–97 season and it began competing in the Intercollegiate Hockey Association (IHA), which included only 4 teams (the other three being Yale, Brown and Columbia), in 1898–99. On the first team in 1896–97 were several players of Canadian background, among them middle-distance runner George Orton. Early years were plagued by the lack of a local rink which forced the program to be suspended multiple times. In 1920 the Philadelphia Ice Palace opened, giving the team a more stable footing to operate, however, the lack of success on ice was evident. Despite growing popularity, the team was forced to fold in 1924 due to insufficient funding. In 1941, Penn re-entered the hockey world, competing in the Eastern Collegiate Hockey League and winning the league title that year. The Quakers continued to compete until the team was forced to dissolve as a result of World War II. Penn's hockey program was resurrected in the 1950s as a club team and became gradually more competitive until eventually reaching the varsity level in 1965.

Penn played at the varsity level for the first time in the 1965–66 season, finishing 16–8. To support the team, in 1968, a group of donors and the Class of 1923 joined to fund the construction of the Class of 1923 Arena. In the 1970–71 season, the Quakers made the ECAC playoffs for the first time. The team would have similar success in the following season. The 1972–73 season was filled with similar success under a new coach, Bob Crocker, even beating defending national champion Boston University 7–3 in the first round of the ECAC tournament in Boston. Crocker had been an assistant coach at BU before coming to Penn.

Following the success of the 1972–73 season, the team began a downward spiral. The university began to tighten the team's budget, which made recruiting more difficult and caused the level of play to decline. After the 1977–78 season, Penn's athletic department announced a plan to drop the hockey team's varsity status, along with that of the gymnastics, golf, and badminton teams, citing budgetary restraints. A 4-day sit-in resulted in an agreement between students and administration to preserve some of the cut programs, but not the varsity hockey team.

Since falling from the varsity level, the Penn Quakers men's ice hockey team has maintained its status as a club team. During this period, the team has enjoyed numerous successes, including several championship appearances and victories. Today, the team competes in the ACHA Division II and continues to call the Class of 1923 Arena its home.

On July 9, 2019, a university-supported endowment for both the men's and women's ice hockey programs was announced. This was later further explained in the team's "2025 Vision" plan, which included a road map for the team to follow from ACHA Division II to NCAA Division I by the year 2025. At the time there was no plan to promote either program to the Division I level.

Season-by-season results

Varsity

Note: GP = Games played, W = Wins, L = Losses, T = Ties, OTL = Overtime Losses (Games lost in either Overtime or Shootout), Pts = Points

* Winning percentage is used when conference schedules are unbalanced.
¿ Information on the 1898–99 and 1900-01 seasons are incomplete.
† Frank Winters only coached the final game of the 1922 season for the Quakers, a win.
‡ Normand Shay coached the team to an 0–6–1 record before being replaced by Percy Fynan for the second half of the season.
¡ Herb Gardiner coached the team for one loss before turning control over to William Farson.

Club

Footnotes

Quakers in the NHL

Source:

References

External links
 

 
Ice Hockey, Men's
American Collegiate Hockey Association
College men's ice hockey teams in the United States